Chris Randall may refer to:

Chris Randall (musician) (born 1968), musician and frontman for industrial rock band Sister Machine Gun
Chris Rathaus (1943–2006), radio DJ, originally known as Chris Randall
Chris Randall (rugby league) (born 1995), Australian rugby league player